David Wayne Johnson (born October 24, 1959) is an American former professional baseball pitcher who spent five seasons in Major League Baseball (MLB) with the Pittsburgh Pirates (1987), Baltimore Orioles (1989–1991) and Detroit Tigers (1993). He has been a baseball analyst with the Mid-Atlantic Sports Network (MASN) and the Orioles Radio Network since 2006.

Johnson is most noted for his emergency start at SkyDome on September 30, 1989, in the regular season's penultimate game, which the Orioles needed to win to extend the AL East championship race by at least one day. Pressed into service as a result of Pete Harnisch accidentally stepping on a nail while returning to his hotel room the previous night, he allowed two hits in seven innings before being subbed out after walking Nelson Liriano to start the eighth with the Orioles leading 3–1. The Toronto Blue Jays scored three times in that inning and won both the match 4–3 and the AL East title.

Johnson was the starting and losing pitcher in Wilson Álvarez' 7–0 no-hitter at Memorial Stadium on August 11, 1991.

He wrote a  Guideposts article titled "Against the Odds," which appeared in the May 1990 issue of the magazine (pp 2–5).

Johnson currently resides in Kingsville, Maryland. His son Steve pitched for the Orioles and the Seattle Mariners.

References

External links

 Bio on Orioles.com

1959 births
Living people
American expatriate baseball players in Canada
Baseball players from Maryland
Baltimore City Community College alumni
Baltimore Orioles announcers
Baltimore Orioles players
CCBC–Catonsville Cardinals baseball players
Detroit Tigers players
Edmonton Trappers players
Hagerstown Suns players
Major League Baseball pitchers
Mid-Atlantic Sports Network
Pittsburgh Pirates players
Sportspeople from Baltimore County, Maryland